Angus Sutherland may refer to:

 Angus Sutherland (actor) (born 1982), Canadian-American actor
 Angus Sutherland (politician) (1848–1922), Scottish Liberal politician